The Golf Club at Harbor Shores is a golf club located in Benton Harbor, Michigan, part of the Harbor Shores development on Lake Michigan.

History
All 18 holes of the course were opened on July 1, 2010. The course held its Grand Opening on July 10, 2010, with Johnny Miller, Arnold Palmer, Tom Watson, and its designer, Jack Nicklaus, in attendance.

Controversy

Local residents have taken exception to the golf course using a portion of the public Jean Klock Park for three of its holes. The Michigan Supreme Court ruled in favor of Harbor Shores to keep the three holes at Jean Klock Park.

Tournaments

Harbor Shores hosted the Senior PGA Championship in 2012, 2014, 2016, and 2018 and is scheduled to host the tournament in 2022, and 2024. Harbor Shores also will also welcome back the Brenda Faxon Invitational in 2022.

Scorecard

The golf course has four distinct sections, as noted on the scorecard.  The first six holes are inland holes; holes 7, 8, and 9 play through dunes, as they are the closest holes to Lake Michigan.  The first four holes on the back nine are woodlands holes; and holes 14-18 are river holes, playing on or near the Paw Paw River.

References

External links
Official site
Harbor Shores Development

Buildings and structures in Berrien County, Michigan
Golf clubs and courses in Michigan
Golf clubs and courses designed by Jack Nicklaus
Sports venues completed in 2010
2010 establishments in Michigan
Benton Harbor, Michigan